The Western Electricity Coordinating Council (WECC) coordinates a number of high voltage power links in western North America. These links, known as WECC Intertie Paths, are not necessarily single transmission line, rather they are interties between various areas. These areas can be quite distant, such as Path 65 between The Dalles, Oregon and Los Angeles, California or short such as Path 62 between Southern California Edison's Eldorado and LADWP's McCullough substations. These are currently numbered from 1 to 81, with a few numbers intentionally omitted.

Table of paths
Since the interties may consist of multiple power-lines, the maximum voltage used is shown in the table below. Some of the links such as Path 65, the Pacific DC Intertie, do consist of a single transmission line, so the maximum voltage is the voltage used.

References

Electric power transmission systems in the United States
HVDC transmission lines